Giacomo de Sanctis (died 1479) was a Roman Catholic prelate who served as Archbishop of Sorrento (1474–1479).

Biography
On 22 Jun 1474, Giacomo de Sanctis was appointed during the papacy of Pope Sixtus IV as Archbishop of Sorrento.
He served as Archbishop of Sorrento until his death in Aug 1479.

References

External links and additional sources
 (for Chronology of Bishops) 
 (for Chronology of Bishops)  

15th-century Roman Catholic archbishops in the Kingdom of Naples
Bishops appointed by Pope Sixtus IV
1479 deaths